Zygoballus maculatipes is a species of jumping spider which occurs in Panama. It is known only from two female specimens, one collected in Soná, and the other collected from the Wilcox camp on the San Lorenzo River (both in Veraguas Province). The species was first described in 1925 by the Russian arachnologist Alexander Petrunkevitch.

Type specimen
The type specimens are housed at the Peabody Museum of Natural History at Yale University.

References

External links

Zygoballus maculatipes at Jumping Spiders of the World

Salticidae
Spiders of Central America
Spiders described in 1925